Flavien Tait (born 2 February 1993) is a French professional footballer who plays as a midfielder for Ligue 1 club Rennes.

Career
On 16 June 2016, Tait signed a two-year contract with Angers SCO. After playing more than 70 games for Angers, he joined Ligue 1 rivals Rennes.

Career statistics
.

References

External links
 
 

1993 births
Living people
People from Longjumeau
French footballers
Association football midfielders
LB Châteauroux players
Angers SCO players
Stade Rennais F.C. players
Ligue 1 players
Ligue 2 players
Championnat National players
Footballers from Essonne